Chava Mond (born 1984) is an Israeli model.

Biography
Chava (Havi) Mond was born  and raised in Safed to a religious Jewish family. She attended the city's religious girls' school. She hoped to study law and become an attorney, but at the age of 16 she was traveling in London with her aunt and was offered a job by a Select model agent. Mond refused, saying that she was religious and that she hadn't completed her high school studies, so Select waited until she turned 18, at which age Mond completed her national service.

She has been described as the first Israeli model to observe the Jewish Sabbath and keep kosher.

She holds joint Israeli and British citizenship, and lives in Finchley.

Modelling career
Mond worked for French Connection, Calvin Klein, Ralph Lauren, The Times (on the cover and in an article), Cosmopolitan, In Style, Harvey Nichols Magazine and Marie Claire. Chava has also been on the catwalk for Chanel, Yves Saint Laurent and London Fashion Week and she has appeared in the advertising campaigns of Laura Ashley, French Connection and Gina Bakoni. As well, she is leading the 2004/5 winter campaign of Armani Jeans and the current, worldwide campaign for Pantene hair products.

Mond refuses to be photographed in swimsuits and underwear for religious reasons.

See also
Israeli fashion
 Esther Petrack – Jewish Orthodox model

References

External links
 
 Interview
 Another interview 
 Havi Mond fan site

1984 births
Living people
Israeli female models
Israeli Orthodox Jews
Jewish female models
Israeli people of British-Jewish descent
People from Safed